Pyrostegia venusta, also commonly known as flamevine or orange trumpet vine, is a plant species of the genus Pyrostegia of the family Bignoniaceae originally native to southern Brazil, Bolivia, northeastern Argentina and Paraguay; today, it is also a widely cultivated garden species.

Description
It is an evergreen, vigorously-growing climber, capable of reaching 5 m in height. The foliage is made up of opposite, pinnate leaves with two or three, 4 to 8 cm  leaflets,, and a 3-branched tendril, which all arise together from the end of the leaf petiole. 

The orange flowers, which appear from winter to spring, are 5 to 9 cm long and densely clustered. They are pollinated by hummingbirds. The fruits are smooth, 3 cm long brown capsules.

Cultivation
The plant is sensitive to cold winds and prefers sunny, sheltered locations. Its frost hardiness USDA zones are 9 to 11. It is resistant to soil salinity. 

The plant has forked tendrils, which will cling to any rough surface, including brick walls. It can be grown from semi-hardwood cuttings taken in summer, autumn or winter.

It is naturalised in eastern Australia, eastern Africa and in the southeastern United States.

Taxonomic history
The species was first described by John Miers in 1863.

Etymology
Venusta means 'beautiful', 'charming', or 'graceful'. Pyrostegia" from the Greek pyros means 'fire', relating to the colour of the flowers and the shape of the upper lip, and stegia means 'covering'. When the flowers cover a building, it may appear to be on fire.

References

External links

Bignoniaceae
Plants described in 1863
Vines
Flora of Brazil
Flora of Bolivia
Flora of Paraguay
Flora of Argentina
Garden plants
Garden plants of South America